Cable television is a system of delivering television programming to consumers via radio frequency (RF) signals transmitted through coaxial cables, or in more recent systems, light pulses through fibre-optic cables. This contrasts with broadcast television (also known as terrestrial television), in which the television signal is transmitted over-the-air by radio waves and received by a television antenna attached to the television; or satellite television, in which the television signal is transmitted over-the-air by radio waves from a communications satellite orbiting the Earth, and received by a satellite dish antenna on the roof. FM radio programming, high-speed Internet, telephone services, and similar non-television services may also be provided through these cables. Analog television was standard in the 20th century, but since the 2000s, cable systems have been upgraded to digital cable operation.

A "cable channel" (sometimes known as a "cable network") is a television network available via cable television. When available through satellite television, including direct broadcast satellite providers such as DirecTV or Dish Network, as well as via IPTV providers such as Verizon FIOS and U-verse TV, this is referred to as a "satellite channel". Alternative terms include "non-broadcast channel" or "programming service", the latter being mainly used in legal contexts. The abbreviation "CATV" is used in the US for cable television and originally stood for community antenna television, from cable television's origins in 1948; in areas where over-the-air TV reception was limited by distance from transmitters or mountainous terrain, large community antennas were constructed, and cable was run from them to individual homes.

In 1968, 6.4% of Americans had cable television. The number increased to 7.5% in 1978. By 1988, 52.8% of all households were using cable. The number further increased to 62.4% in 1994.

Distribution

To receive cable television at a given location, cable distribution lines must be available on the local utility poles or underground utility lines. Coaxial cable brings the signal to the customer's building through a service drop, an overhead or underground cable. If the subscriber's building does not have a cable service drop, the cable company will install one. The standard cable used in the U.S. is RG-6, which has a 75 ohm impedance, and connects with a type F connector. The cable company's portion of the wiring usually ends at a distribution box on the building exterior, and built-in cable wiring in the walls usually distributes the signal to jacks in different rooms to which televisions are connected. Multiple cables to different rooms are split off the incoming cable with a small device called a splitter. There are two standards for cable television; older analog cable, and newer digital cable which can carry data signals used by digital television receivers such as high-definition television (HDTV) equipment. All cable companies in the United States have switched to or are in the course of switching to digital cable television since it was first introduced in the late 1990s.

Most cable companies require a set-top box (cable converter box) or a slot on one's TV set for conditional access module cards to view their cable channels, even on newer televisions with digital cable QAM tuners, because most digital cable channels are now encrypted, or "scrambled", to reduce cable service theft. A cable from the jack in the wall is attached to the input of the box, and an output cable from the box is attached to the television, usually the RF-IN or composite input on older TVs. Since the set-top box only decodes the single channel that is being watched, each television in the house requires a separate box. Some unencrypted channels, usually traditional over-the-air broadcast networks, can be displayed without a receiver box. The cable company will provide set-top boxes based on the level of service a customer purchases, from basic set-top boxes with a standard-definition picture connected through the standard coaxial connection on the TV, to high-definition wireless digital video recorder (DVR) receivers connected via HDMI or component. Older analog television sets are "cable ready" and can receive the old analog cable without a set-top box. To receive digital cable channels on an analog television set, even unencrypted ones, requires a different type of box, a digital television adapter supplied by the cable company or purchased by the subscriber.  Another new distribution method that takes advantage of the low cost high quality DVB distribution to residential areas, uses TV gateways to convert the DVB-C, DVB-C2 stream to IP for distribution of TV over IP network in the home. Many cable companies offer internet access through DOCSIS.

Principle of operation

In the most common system, multiple television channels (as many as 500, although this varies depending on the provider's available channel capacity) are distributed to subscriber residences through a coaxial cable, which comes from a trunkline supported on utility poles originating at the cable company's local distribution facility, called the "headend". Many channels can be transmitted through one coaxial cable by a technique called frequency division multiplexing. At the headend, each television channel is translated to a different frequency. By giving each channel a different frequency "slot" on the cable, the separate television signals do not interfere with each other. At an outdoor cable box on the subscriber's residence, the company's service drop cable is connected to cables distributing the signal to different rooms in the building. At each television, the subscriber's television or a set-top box provided by the cable company translates the desired channel back to its original frequency (baseband), and it is displayed onscreen. Due to widespread cable theft in earlier analog systems, the signals are typically encrypted on modern digital cable systems, and the set-top box must be activated by an activation code sent by the cable company before it will function, which is only sent after the subscriber signs up. If the subscriber fails to pay their bill, the cable company can send a signal to deactivate the subscriber's box, preventing reception.

There are also usually "upstream" channels on the cable to send data from the customer box to the cable headend, for advanced features such as requesting pay-per-view shows or movies, cable internet access, and cable telephone service. The "downstream" channels occupy a band of frequencies from approximately 50 MHz to 1 GHz, while the "upstream" channels occupy frequencies of 5 to 42 MHz. Subscribers pay with a monthly fee. Subscribers can choose from several levels of service, with "premium" packages including more channels but costing a higher rate. At the local headend, the feed signals from the individual television channels are received by dish antennas from communication satellites. Additional local channels, such as local broadcast television stations, educational channels from local colleges, and community access channels devoted to local governments (PEG channels) are usually included on the cable service. Commercial advertisements for local business are also inserted in the programming at the headend (the individual channels, which are distributed nationally, also have their own nationally oriented commercials).

Hybrid fiber-coaxial

Modern cable systems are large, with a single network and headend often serving an entire metropolitan area. Most systems use hybrid fiber-coaxial (HFC) distribution; this means the trunklines that carry the signal from the headend to local neighborhoods are optical fiber to provide greater bandwidth and also extra capacity for future expansion. At the headend, the electrical signal is translated into an optical signal and sent through the fiber. The fiber trunkline goes to several distribution hubs, from which multiple fibers fan out to carry the signal to boxes called optical nodes in local communities. At the optical node, the optical signal is translated back into an electrical signal and carried by coaxial cable distribution lines on utility poles, from which cables branch out to a series of signal amplifiers and line extenders. These devices carry the signal to customers via passive RF devices called taps.

History 
The very first cable networks were operated locally, notably in 1936 in London in the United Kingdom and the same year in Berlin in Germany, notably for the Olympic Games, and from 1948 onwards in the United States and Switzerland. This type of local cable network was mainly used to relay terrestrial channels in geographical areas poorly served by terrestrial television signals.

History in North America 

Cable television began in the United States as a commercial business in 1950, although there were small-scale systems by hobbyists in the 1940s.

The early systems simply received weak (broadcast) channels, amplified them, and sent them over unshielded wires to the subscribers, limited to a community or to adjacent communities. The receiving antenna would be taller than any individual subscriber could afford, thus bringing in stronger signals; in hilly or mountainous terrain it would be placed at a high elevation.

At the outset, cable systems only served smaller communities without television stations of their own, and which could not easily receive signals from stations in cities because of distance or hilly terrain. In Canada, however, communities with their own signals were fertile cable markets, as viewers wanted to receive American signals. Rarely, as in the college town of Alfred, New York, U.S. cable systems retransmitted Canadian channels.

Although early (VHF) television receivers could receive 12 channels (2–13), the maximum number of channels that could be broadcast in one city was 7: channels 2, 4, either 5 or 6, 7, 9, 11 and 13, as receivers at the time were unable to receive strong (local) signals on adjacent channels without distortion. (There were frequency gaps between 4 and 5, and between 6 and 7, which allowed both to be used in the same city).

As equipment improved, all twelve channels could be utilized, except where a local VHF television station broadcast. Local broadcast channels were not usable for signals deemed to be a priority, but technology allowed low-priority signals to be placed on such channels by synchronizing their blanking intervals. TVs were unable to reconcile these blanking intervals and the slight changes  due to travel through a medium, causing ghosting. The bandwidth of the amplifiers also was limited, meaning frequencies over 250 MHz were difficult to transmit to distant portions of the coaxial network, and UHF channels could not be used at all. To expand beyond 12 channels, non-standard "midband" channels had to be used, located between the FM band and Channel 7, or "superband" beyond Channel 13 up to about 300 MHz; these channels initially were only accessible using separate tuner boxes that sent the chosen channel into the TV set on Channel 2, 3 or 4. Initially, UHF broadcast stations were at a disadvantage because the standard TV sets in use at the time were unable to receive their channels. With the passage of the All-Channel Receiver Act in 1964, all new television sets were required to include a UHF tuner, nonetheless, it would still take a few years for UHF stations to become competitive.

Before being added to the cable box itself, these midband channels were used for early incarnations of pay TV, e.g. The Z Channel (Los Angeles) and HBO but transmitted in the clear i.e. not scrambled as standard TV sets of the period could not pick up the signal nor could the average consumer de-tune the normal stations to be able to receive it.

Once tuners that could receive select mid-band and super-band channels began to be incorporated into standard television sets, broadcasters were forced to either install scrambling circuitry or move these signals further out of the range of reception for early cable-ready TVs and VCRs. However, once consumer sets had the ability to receive all 181 FCC allocated channels, premium broadcasters were left with no choice but to scramble.

Unfortunately for pay-TV operators, the descrambling circuitry was often published in electronics hobby magazines such as Popular Science and Popular Electronics allowing anybody with anything more than a rudimentary knowledge of broadcast electronics to be able to build their own and receive the programming without cost.

Later, the cable operators began to carry FM radio stations, and encouraged subscribers to connect their FM stereo sets to cable. Before stereo and bilingual TV sound became common, Pay-TV channel sound was added to the FM stereo cable line-ups. About this time, operators expanded beyond the 12-channel dial to use the "midband" and "superband" VHF channels adjacent to the "high band" 7–13 of North American television frequencies. Some operators as in Cornwall, Ontario, used a dual distribution network with Channels 2–13 on each of the two cables.

During the 1980s, United States regulations not unlike public, educational, and government access (PEG) created the beginning of cable-originated live television programming. As cable penetration increased, numerous cable-only TV stations were launched, many with their own news bureaus that could provide more immediate and more localized content than that provided by the nearest network newscast.

Such stations may use similar on-air branding as that used by the nearby broadcast network affiliate, but the fact that these stations do not broadcast over the air and are not regulated by the FCC, their call signs are meaningless. These stations evolved partially into today's over-the-air digital subchannels, where a main broadcast TV station e.g. NBS 37* would – in the case of no local CNB or ABS station being available – rebroadcast the programming from a nearby affiliate but fill in with its own news and other community programming to suit its own locale. Many live local programs with local interests were subsequently created all over the United States in most major television markets in the early 1980s.

This evolved into today's many cable-only broadcasts of diverse programming, including cable-only produced television movies and miniseries. Cable specialty channels, starting with channels oriented to show movies and large sporting or performance events, diversified further, and "narrowcasting" became common.  By the late 1980s, cable-only signals outnumbered broadcast signals on cable systems, some of which by this time had expanded beyond 35 channels. By the mid-1980s in Canada, cable operators were allowed by the regulators to enter into distribution contracts with cable networks on their own.

By the 1990s, tiers became common, with customers able to subscribe to different tiers to obtain different selections of additional channels above the basic selection. By subscribing to additional tiers, customers could get specialty channels, movie channels, and foreign channels. Large cable companies used addressable descramblers to limit access to premium channels for customers not subscribing to higher tiers, however the above magazines often published workarounds for that technology as well.

During the 1990s, the pressure to accommodate the growing array of offerings resulted in digital transmission that made more efficient use of the VHF signal capacity; fibre optics was common to carry signals into areas near the home, where coax could carry higher frequencies over the short remaining distance. Although for a time in the 1980s and 1990s, television receivers and VCRs were equipped to receive the mid-band and super-band channels. Due to the fact that the descrambling circuitry was for a time present in these tuners, depriving the cable operator of much of their revenue, such cable-ready tuners are rarely used now – requiring a return to the set-top boxes used from the 1970s onward.

The conversion to digital broadcasting has put all signals – broadcast and cable – into digital form, rendering analog cable television service mostly obsolete, functional in an ever-dwindling supply of select markets. Analog television sets are still accommodated, but their tuners are mostly obsolete, oftentimes dependent entirely on the set-top box.

Deployments by continent

Cable television is mostly available in North America, Europe, Australia, Asia and South America. Cable television has had little success in Africa, as it is not cost-effective to lay cables in sparsely populated areas. So-called "Wireless Cable" microwave-based systems are used instead.

Other cable-based services
Coaxial cables are capable of bi-directional carriage of signals as well as the transmission of large amounts of data. Cable television signals use only a portion of the bandwidth available over coaxial lines. This leaves plenty of space available for other digital services such as cable internet, cable telephony and wireless services, using both unlicensed and licensed spectrum. Broadband internet access is achieved over coaxial cable by using cable modems to convert the network data into a type of digital signal that can be transferred over coaxial cable. One problem with some cable systems is the older amplifiers placed along the cable routes are unidirectional thus in order to allow for uploading of data the customer would need to use an analog telephone modem to provide for the upstream connection. This limited the upstream speed to 31.2 Kbp/s and prevented the always-on convenience broadband internet typically provides. Many large cable systems have upgraded or are upgrading their equipment to allow for bi-directional signals, thus allowing for greater upload speed and always-on convenience, though these upgrades are expensive.

In North America, Australia and Europe, many cable operators have already introduced cable telephone service, which operates just like existing fixed line operators. This service involves installing a special telephone interface at the customer's premises that converts the analog signals from the customer's in-home wiring into a digital signal, which is then sent on the local loop (replacing the analog last mile, or plain old telephone service (POTS) to the company's switching center, where it is connected to the public switched telephone network (PSTN). The biggest obstacle to cable telephone service is the need for nearly 100% reliable service for emergency calls. One of the standards available for digital cable telephony, PacketCable, seems to be the most promising and able to work with the quality of service (QOS) demands of traditional analog plain old telephone service (POTS) service. The biggest advantage to digital cable telephone service is similar to the advantage of digital cable, namely that data can be compressed, resulting in much less bandwidth used than a dedicated analog circuit-switched service. Other advantages include better voice quality and integration to a Voice over Internet Protocol (VoIP) network providing cheap or unlimited nationwide and international calling. In many cases, digital cable telephone service is separate from cable modem service being offered by many cable companies and does not rely on Internet Protocol (IP) traffic or the Internet.

Traditional cable television providers and traditional telecommunication companies increasingly compete in providing voice, video and data services to residences. The combination of television, telephone and Internet access is commonly called "triple play", regardless of whether CATV or telcos offer it.

See also

 AllVid
 CableCARD
 "CCTV" as closed-circuit television—not to be confused with CATV
 DOCSIS
 DVB-C
 European cable television frequencies
 List of cable television companies 
 Multichannel video programming distributor
 North American television frequencies
 Private cable operator
 QAM (television)
 Satellite television
 Switched video
 Tru2way

References

Further reading
 The history of Rediffusion by Gerald K Clode
 Eisenmann, Thomas R., "Cable TV: From Community Antennas to Wired Cities", Harvard Business School Weekly Newsletter, July 10, 2000
 Moss, Mitchell L.; Payne, Frances, "Can Cable Keep Its Promise?", New York Affairs, Volume 6, Number 4. New York University. 1981
 Smith, Ralph Lee, "The Wired Nation", The Nation magazine, May 18, 1970
 Smith, Ralph Lee, The Wired Nation; Cable TV: the electronic communications highway. New York, Harper & Row, 1972.

External links 

 

 
British inventions